The Asia Graduate School of Theology (AGST) is a consortium of evangelical theological seminaries. It was established by Asia Theological Association in 1984, and consists of three bodies: AGST Japan, AGST Philippines, and AGST Alliance (Cambodia, Malaysia, Myanmar, Singapore, and Thailand).

AGST's purpose is to enable its member seminaries to offer advanced degrees, especially doctorates, to prepare scholars and leaders for the Church and society in Asia. AGST was self-consciously modelled on the South East Asia Graduate School of Theology, which is operated by the Association for Theological Education in South East Asia.

Bong Rin Ro notes that AGST was formed to stop the "brain drain" of Asian Christian workers to the West: "The Asian Church had depended on western seminaries and churches too long, and the time had come for us to be independent from the West in theological education; otherwise, we would not be able to grow ourselves." He goes on to note that one of AGST's objectives was to "encourage cultural adaptation of theological education. Asian students needed to study theological training within their cultural contexts of poverty, suffering, injustice, non-Christian religions, and communism."

AGST's original plan was to have a consortium in Korea, but as Bong Rin Ro notes, "the AGST in Korea did not succeed due to the lack of cooperation among the evangelical seminaries in Korea."

AGST Japan
AGST Japan has five member institutions.

Member institutions
 Tokyo Christian University
 Tokyo Biblical Seminary
 Kobe Lutheran Seminary
 Osaka Christian College and Seminary
 Immanuel Bible College

AGST Philippines

AGST Philippines is recognised by the Commission on Higher Education in the Philippines. It publishes its own journal, the Journal of Asian Mission. JAM has been used as a "venue through which to explore the socio-missiological implications of Flilipino Pentecostalism."

Member institutions
Asia-Pacific Nazarene Theological Seminary
Asia Pacific Theological Seminary
Asian Seminary of Christian Ministries
Asian Theological Seminary
Biblical Seminary of the Philippines
International Graduate School of Leadership
Koinonia Theological Seminary Foundation, Inc.
PTS College & Advanced Studies

Degrees offered
AGST Philippines offers the following degrees:

 Doctor of Education in Christian Counseling
 Doctor of Philosophy in Transformational Development
 Doctor of Philosophy in Transformational Learning
 Master of Theology / Doctor of Philosophy in Biblical Studies
 Master of Theology / Doctor of Philosophy in Theological Studies & Church History
 Master of Theology / Doctor of Philosophy in Peace Studies
 Doctor of Philosophy in Holistic Child Development
 Doctor of Missiology / Doctor of Philosophy in Intercultural Studies
 Doctor of Ministry in Peace Studies
 Master of Theology / Doctor of Philosophy in Orality Studies

AGST Alliance

AGST Alliance was established in 2004 as the AGST (Malaysia/Singapore) consortium.

Member institutions

Malaysia
 Bible College of Malaysia
 Malaysia Baptist Theological Seminary
 Malaysia Bible Seminary

Myanmar
 Myanmar Evangelical Graduate School of Theology

Singapore
East Asia School of Theology

Thailand
 Bangkok Bible Seminary
 Thailand Pentecostal Seminary

Additionally, Chiang Mai Theological Seminary (Thailand), Malaysia Evangelical College (Sarawak), and Phnom Penh Bible School (Cambodia) are associate members.

Degrees offered
AGST Alliance offers the following degrees:

 Master of Theology (Th.M.)
 Master of Theology (Biblical Studies)
 Master of Theology (Education) in Spiritual Formation and Discipleship
 Master of Transformational Development
 Doctor of Philosophy in Education (Ph.D.)
 Doctor of Philosophy in Theology
 Doctor of Philosophy in Biblical Studies
 Doctor of Education in Child & Family Development (Ed.D.)
 Doctor of Ministry in Leadership (D.Min.)

References

External links
 AGST Alliance
 AGST Philippines

Evangelical seminaries and theological colleges
Educational institutions established in 1984
College and university associations and consortia in Asia